The Army of Glory, formerly the Union of Glory, is a Sunni Islamist Syrian rebel group affiliated with the Free Syrian Army active in northwestern Syria, mainly in the al-Ghab Plain in northern Hama and its surroundings. Turkey, Qatar, and Saudi Arabia have supplied the group with anti-tank missiles including 9K111 Fagots and BGM-71 TOWs. The group has also expressed its disapproval of international efforts such as the Astana and Sochi agreements for de-escalating the war in Syria, and has opposed Russia's involvement in the war. Jaysh al-Izza also made efforts to join the Turkish-backed National Front for Liberation which includes other prominent Syrian opposition groups in Idlib such as Ahrar al-Sham and the Sham Legion, but did not do so out of complications with the integration about which Jaysh al-Izza's leadership did not elaborate.

History

On 30 September 2015, the first day of the Russian military intervention in the Syrian Civil War, 2 Russian bombs with 8-10 submunitions struck the group's headquarters and arms depots in a cave in the village of Al-Lataminah in northern Hama.

During the 2016 Hama offensive in September 2016, Jaysh al-Izza used a BGM-71 TOW missile to blow up a low-flying  Aérospatiale Gazelle helicopter, which they alleged to be Russian.

In September 2018, Jaysh al-Izza originally accepted the 2018 Idlib demilitarization brokered by Russia and Turkey, with the group's leadership extending their gratitude to the Turkish President Erdoğan for coordinating the agreement. The group later became hostile to the agreement, however, after it was revealed that Syrian Government and other pro-Assad forces would not be required to withdraw from the DMZ and would instead be responsible for governing the opposition-held areas.

On June 8, 2019 Abdel Baset al-Sarout, a senior Jaysh al-Izza commander and key member of the Syrian opposition, died from the wounds he sustained during combat with the Syrian Army two days prior.

Following the 2017 Hama offensive, 2017-2018 Northwestern Syria campaign and the subsequent 2019 National Front for Liberation–Tahrir al-Sham conflict, the group's territorial control was confined to the areas around Kafr Zita and Al-Lataminah. Those areas were subsequently captured by the Syrian Army in the 2019 Northwestern Syria offensive, after Jaysh al-Izza, among other rebel groups, withdrew from the region to avoid being encircled by government forces.

On 11 August 2019, Jamil al-Saleh retired as commander-in-chief of the group, citing "personal matters." He was replaced by Col. Mustafa al-Bakour. At some point Saleh returned to the group.

Pro-government media outlets reported that over 2,000 Jaysh al-Izza members relocated to rebel-held areas around Jisr al-Shughur, after retreating from Northern Hama during the course of the offensive. They further reported that the group had started fighting alongside the Turkistan Islamic Party in Syria. Jaysh al-Izza itself did not comment on the reports. The group moved its headquarters to the Kafr Nabl area, which came under Russian attack on several occasions.

Jaysh al-Izza significantly declined and left in a state of disarray following defeat in the Syrian Army's Dawn of Idlib 1 campaign. The group lacked funding and military aid except for ammunition stores already available in Idlib and money received from supporters. It also suffered a decline in popularity with Syrian Opposition supporters due to a failure to comply with military determinants, and the group's perceived closer relations with Hayat Tahrir al-Sham. The group also faced a rash of defections. On 9 October 2019, 500 fighters from Jaysh al-Izza, including its deputy commander-in-chief Capt. Manaf Maarati and spokesman Capt. Mustafa Maarati, reportedly defected to the National Front for Liberation. This reportedly left less than 500 soldiers in Jaysh al-Izza.

In early November 2019, the Homs al-Adiyyeh Brigade of the Sultan Murad Division of the Syrian National Army defected to Jaysh al-Izza after the unilateral release of several Syrian Army prisoners of war by the Turkish government in the context of the Second Northern Syria Buffer Zone.

On 23 November 2019, Russian warplanes carried out airstrikes on Jaysh al-Izza's headquarters near Kafr Nabl, killing two fighters and injuring six.

In late January 2020, Mustafa al-Bakour announced publicly his groups participation in the battle for Idlib, though Jaysh al-Izza had reportedly participated since the fighting began.

On 24 January 2020, Jaysh al-Izza's anti-armor squadron reportedly destroyed a missile launch platform of the Syrian army using an anti-tank thermal guided missile in the village of Tah.

On 27 January 2020 Jaysh al-Izza took part in a counterattack along with HTS, Incite the Believers, and Ansar al-Tawhid against the Syrian Army and Iranian-backed militias in several villages east of Idlib.

On 30 January 2020, The Russian Air Force carried out airstrikes on Jaysh al-Izza's headquarters following the beginning of recruitment by the latter, killing three fighters and injuring several others.

On 16 February Jaysh al-Izza targeted a group of Syrian Army soldiers with a thermal-guided ATGM on the Abdeen village axis.

Following the end of fighting, Jaysh al-Izza continued recruitment, holding several graduations of fighters including special forces in July 2020, at a training camp near the Bab al-Hawa Border Crossing.

References

External links
Twitter account (still active)
YouTube account (not active)
https://twitter.com/jamelalsaleh0/

Anti-government factions of the Syrian civil war
Free Syrian Army
2013 establishments in Syria